Below are the winners of the 2005 Billboard Latin Music Awards. The 12th annual event was held April 28 at Florida's Miami Arena and broadcast live on the Telemundo network.

The Billboard Latin Music Awards honor the most popular albums, song, and performers in Latin music, as determined by the actual sales and radio airplay data that shapes Billboards weekly charts during a one-year period from the issue dated Feb. 14, 2004, through this year's Feb. 5 issue.

Hot Latin Track Of The Year

 "Nada Valgo Sin Tu Amor," Juanes (Surco/Universal Latino)

Hot Latin Track Of The Year, Vocal Duet
 "Duele El Amor," Aleks Syntek With Ana Torroja (EMI Latin)

Hot Latin Tracks Artist Of The Year 
 Paulina Rubio (Universal Latino)

Songwriter Of The Year
 Leonel Garcia

Producer Of The Year
  Rudy Perez

Latin Pop Album Of The Year, Male 
 "Mi Sangre," Juanes (Surco/Universal Latino)

Latin Pop Album Of The Year, Female 
 "Pau-Latina," Paulina Rubio (Universal Latino)

Latin Pop Album Of The Year, Duo Or Group 
 "Fuego," A.B. Quintanilla III Presents Kumbia Kings (EMI Latin)

Latin Pop Album Of The Year, New Artist 
 "Si," Julieta Venegas (Ariola/BMG Latin)

Top Latin Albums Artist Of The Year 
 Los Temerarios (Fonovisa/UG)

Latin Rock/Alternative Album Of The Year
  "Street Signs," Ozomatli (Concord Picante/Concord)

Tropical Album Of The Year, Male 
 "Para Ti," Juan Luis Guerra (Vene/Universal Latino)

Tropical Album Of The Year, Female 
 "Flor De Amor," Omara Portuondo (World Circuit/Nonesuch/Warner Bros.)

Tropical Album Of The Year, Duo or Group
 "Hasta El Fin," Monchy & Alexandra (J&N/Sony Discos)

Tropical Album Of The Year, New Artist 
 "Recordando Los Terricolas," Michael Stevan (Fonovisa/UG)

Regional Mexican Album Of The Year, Male Solo Artist 
 "Mexico En La Piel," Luis Miguel (Warner Latina)

Regional Mexican Album Of The Year, Male Duo Or Group 
 "Za Za Za," Grupo Climax (Musart/Balboa)

Regional Mexican Album Of The Year, Female Group or Female Solo Artist
  "Locos De Amor," Los Horoscopos De Durango (Procan/Disa)

Regional Mexican Album Of The Year, New Artist
  "Za Za Za," Grupo Climax (Musart/Balboa)

Latin Greatest Hits Album Of The Year 
 "Dos Grandes," Marco Antonio Solis & Joan Sebastian (Fonovisa/UG)

Latin Compilation Album Of The Year 
 "Agarron Duranguense," Various Artists (Disa)

Latin Jazz Album Of The Year 
 "Cositas Buenas," Paco De Lucia (Blue Thumb/GRP)

Latin Dance Club Play Track Of The Year 
 "Not In Love/No Es Amor (Club Remixes)," Enrique Iglesias (Interscope/Universal Latino)

Latin Rap/Hip-Hop Album Of The Year 
 "KOMP 104.9 Radio Compa," Akwid (Univision/UG)

Publisher Of The Year
 WB, ASCAP

Publishing Corporation Of The Year 
 Warner/Chappell Music Publishing

Latin Pop Airplay Track Of The Year, Male 
 "Nada Valgo Sin Tu Amor," Juanes (Surco/Universal Latino)

Latin Pop Airplay Track Of The Year, Female 
 "Te Quise Tanto," Paulina Rubio (Universal Latino)

Latin Pop Airplay Track Of The Year, Duo or Group 
 "Duele El Amor," Aleks Syntek With Ana Torroja (EMI Latin)

Latin Pop Airplay Track Of The Year, New Artist
 "Aunque No Te Pueda Ver," Alex Ubago (Warner Latina)

Tropical Airplay Track Of The Year, Male
 "Tengo Ganas," Victor Manuelle (Sony Discos)

Tropical Airplay Track Of The Year, Female 
 "Tu Fotografia," Gloria Estefan (Epic/Sony Discos)

Tropical Airplay Track Of The Year, Duo Or Group 
 "Perdidos," Monchy & Alexandra (J&N)

Tropical Airplay Track Of The Year, New Artist 
 "Quitemonos La Ropa," NG2 (Sony Discos)

Regional Mexican Airplay Track Of The Year, Male Solo Artist 
 "Nadie Es Eterno," Adan Chalino Sanchez (Moon/Costarola/Sony Discos)

Regional Mexican Airplay Track Of The Year, Male Group 
 "Esta Llorando Mi Corazon," Beto Y Sus Canarios (Disa)

Regional Mexican Airplay Track Of The Year, Female Group or Female Solo Artist 
 "Dos Locos," Los Horoscopos De Durango (Procan/Disa)

Regional Mexican Airplay Track Of The Year, New Artist 
 "Dos Locos," Los Horoscopos De Durango (Procan/Disa)

Latin Christian/Gospel Album Of The Year
 "Para Ti," Juan Luis Guerra (Vene/Universal Latino)

Latin Tour Of The Year 
 Vicente Fernandez (Sony Discos)

Reggaeton Album Of The Year 
 "Barrio Fino," Daddy Yankee (El Cartel/VI Music)

Hot Latin Tracks Label Of The Year 
 Sony Discos

Top Latin Albums Label Of The Year 
 Univision Music Group

Latin Pop Airplay Label Of The Year
 Sony Discos

Tropical Airplay Label Of The Year 
 Sony Discos

Regional Mexican Airplay Label Of The Year 
 Disa

Latin Pop Albums Label Of The Year
 Sony Discos

Tropical Albums Label Of The Year 
 Universal Latino

Regional Mexican Albums Label Of The Year 
 Univision Music Group

Billboard Lifetime Achievement Award 
 Marco Antonio Solis

Billboard Spirit Of Hope Award 
 Juan Luis Guerra

Telemundo Star Award
 Marc Anthony

Telemundo Viewer's Choice Award 
 David Bisbal

References

Billboard Latin Music Awards
Latin Billboard Music Awards
Latin Billboard Music Awards
Latin Billboard Music Awards
Latin Billboard Music